Drunk Dynasty is the tenth studio album by American rock band Bowling for Soup, released on October 14, 2016. The album was initially intended to be a 6-8 song EP but over the time spent in the studio recording there were still songs leftover so the band decided to release a full length album instead. The album is entirely fan funded through PledgeMusic, which the band would provide regular updates to pledgers throughout the making of the album which. It is the final studio album to feature bass guitarist Erik Chandler before his official departure on January 12, 2019.

Production and recording
On May 11, 2016, the band announced they have launched a new campaign project again using the fan funded Pledgemusic to record an EP. The campaign reached its goal on May 20th. The next day Reddick presented the new album cover illustrated by Dave Pearson of the band Lacey. In June the band would enter the studio in Denton, Texas. Day one in the recording studio, "two songs done on drums and rhythm guitar...one on bass. We start tomorrow with two more.." The first titled song "Shit To Do" was announced on June 7th and that Chandler was recording bass to it. Later that day a second song title was given with a video clip of Wiseman recording "She Used To Be Mine". A third update with a new song and a video clip showed Burney recording "Go To Bed Mad". Wiseman began tracking drums on June 8th for "Don't Be A Dick" and Reddick would also show a short audio clip of the song's drums, bass and rhythm guitar for the first verse. June 9th they were tracking "Beer on a Sunday" which Reddick said "We did this one totally live!". In July Vocals would be recorded and on the 8th an update from Reddick stated "I am super happy to announce that instead of an EP, Drunk Dynasty will be a FULL album!" and that three more songs would be recorded next month. In August the band would go to Los Angeles, California to record three more songs at The Lair. A video update on September 6th showed that Reddick was finishing vocals to "She Doesn't Think That It's Ever Gonna Work Out". Mixing and Mastering would begin mid month. A Video with Reddick mentioning that The Dollyrots Kelly Ogden will be singing on "Happy as Happy Gets". The new single "Hey Diane" was released to pledgers on October 1st. A digital download of the album was first made available to pledge members on the 13th.

Track listing 
All songs written by Jarinus except "She Used To Be Mine", "Ever Gonna Work Out", and "Stop Doing That" written by Jaret Reddick and "Hey Jealousy" written by Doug Hopkins.

Personnel
Bowling for Soup
 Jaret Reddick - vocals, guitar
 Chris Burney - guitars, vocals
 Erik Chandler - bass guitar, vocals
 Gary Wiseman - drums

Production
 Jarinus (Jaret Reddick & Linus of Hollywood) - producer
 Jay Ruston - mixing (at TRS West)
 John Douglas - assistant mix engineer
 Paul Logus - mastering (at PLX Mastering)
 Dave Pearson - artwork

References

2016 albums
Bowling for Soup albums